The 1977 World Junior Ice Hockey Championships (1977 WJHC) were held between December 22, 1976, and January 2, 1977, in Banská Bystrica and Zvolen, Czechoslovakia.
The Soviet team won the tournament with a perfect 7–0 record.
This was the fourth edition of the Ice Hockey World Junior Championship, but the first to be included in official IIHF records.
Canada was represented by the 1976 Memorial Cup champions St. Catharines Fincups with eight additions from other OHA teams, but the other seven nations were represented by teams of their top under-20 players.
The tournament was expanded to eight teams, with West Germany and Poland making their debut.

Final standings
The tournament was a round-robin format, with each team playing each of the other seven teams once each.

While not relegated, Poland did have the opportunity to play a challenge against Switzerland for inclusion in the 1978 World Junior Ice Hockey Championships, but declined.

Results

Scoring leaders

Tournament awards

References

World Junior Ice Hockey Championships
World Junior Ice Hockey Championships
World Junior Ice Hockey Championships
1976 in Czechoslovak sport
1976 in ice hockey
International ice hockey competitions hosted by Czechoslovakia
December 1976 sports events in Europe
January 1977 sports events in Europe
Sport in Banská Bystrica
Zvolen